This page details numerous records and characteristics of individuals who have held the office of Prime Minister of Australia.

Period of service

Time in office
Sir Robert Menzies was the longest serving prime minister of Australia, serving for 18 years and 163 days total. His first tenure (1939–1941) lasted 2 years and 125 days and his second tenure (1949–1966) 16 years and 38 days. 
Menzies’ second term of over 16 years was the longest single term. This term is also longer than the accumulated period of terms of any other prime minister.
The shortest serving prime minister was Frank Forde, who served in the position in an interim capacity for one week in July 1945 after the death of John Curtin.
The prime minister with the longest time between the beginning of the first and end of the last terms was also Menzies, with over 25 years between those dates.

Number of terms
If a “term” is defined as a contiguous period served as Prime Minister, both Alfred Deakin and Andrew Fisher served the greatest number of terms, with three each. Robert Menzies and Kevin Rudd both served two separate terms as Prime Ministers.
If a “term” is defined as a period of office separated by an election, Robert Menzies served the most terms, winning eight terms.

Terms of prime ministers and reigns of monarchs of Australia
The office of Prime Minister of Australia has existed under the reigns of seven monarchs since Federation in 1901.

Number of monarchs served under
Joseph Lyons is the only prime minister to have served under three monarchs during one term (Lyons died in 1939):

 George V, (1932–1936)
 Edward VIII, (1936)
 George VI, (1936–1939)

Through being in office at transitions between reigns, four prime ministers each served under two monarchs. These include:

 Edmund Barton (Victoria and Edward VII)
 Andrew Fisher (Edward VII and George V) 
 Robert Menzies (George VI and Elizabeth II)
 Anthony Albanese (Elizabeth II and Charles III)

Queen Elizabeth II had by far the greatest number of prime ministers serve her during her reign, being 16. In descending numerical order, numbers of prime ministers in office during all monarch's reigns are:
 Elizabeth II (1952–2022) – sixteen, from Menzies to Albanese
 George VI (1936–1952) – seven, from Lyons to Chifley
 George V (1910–1936) – six, from Fisher to Lyons
 Edward VII (1901–1910) – five, from Barton to Fisher
 Charles III (2022–present) – one (Albanese)
 Edward VIII (1936) – one (Lyons)
 Victoria (1901) – one (Barton)

Prime ministers born during reigns in which they held office
Only seven prime ministers came to serve office under sovereigns in whose own reigns they were born in. The present prime minister, Anthony Albanese, was the sixth prime minister to have been born in the reign of Elizabeth II.

Queen Victoria (reigned 1837–1901)
 Edmund Barton (born 1849, served 1901–1903)

Queen Elizabeth II (reigned 1952–2022)
 Malcolm Turnbull (born 1954, served 2015–2018)
 Kevin Rudd (born 1957, served 2007–2010, 2013)
 Tony Abbott (born 1957, served 2013–2015)
 Julia Gillard (born 1961, served 2010–2013)
 Anthony Albanese (born 1963, served 2022–present)
 Scott Morrison (born 1968, served 2018–2022)

Morrison has the additional distinction of being younger than all of his monarch's children.

Prime ministers who lived under most reigns
Billy Hughes (1862–1952), Stanley Bruce (1883–1967), James Scullin (1876–1953), Earle Page (1880–1961), Robert Menzies (1894–1978), Arthur Fadden (1894–1973), Frank Forde (1890–1983), and John McEwen (1900–1980) all lived under the reigns of six sovereigns: Victoria, Edward VII, George V, Edward VIII, George VI and Elizabeth II.

Number of governors-general served under
Robert Menzies is the only prime minister to have served under six governors-general during his time in office (1939–1941, 1949–1966):

 Lord Gowrie, (1939–1945)
 William McKell, (1949–1953)
 William Slim, (1953–1960) 
 Viscount Dunrossil, (1960–1961)
 Viscount De L'Isle, (1961–1965)
 Lord Casey, (1965–1966)

Two prime ministers each served under three governors-general. These include:

 Malcolm Fraser (John Kerr, Zelman Cowen, and Ninian Stephen)
 John Howard (William Deane, Peter Hollingworth, and Michael Jeffery)

Lord Gowrie has the distinction of having the greatest number of prime ministers serve during his term, being 5:
 
 Joseph Lyons, (1936–1939)
 Earle Page, (1939)
 Robert Menzies, (1939–1941) 
 Arthur Fadden, (1941)
 John Curtin, (1941–1945)

Lord Casey follows with 4:

 Robert Menzies, (1965–1966) 
 Harold Holt, (1966–1967)
 John McEwen, (1967–1968)
 John Gorton, (1968–1969)

Six governors general each had three prime ministers serve during their term. These include:

 Lord Northcote (Alfred Deakin, Chris Watson, and George Reid)
 Sir Ronald Munro Ferguson (Andrew Fisher, Joseph Cook, and Billy Hughes)
 Prince Henry, Duke of Gloucester (John Curtin, Frank Forde, and Ben Chifley)
 Paul Hasluck (John Gorton, William McMahon, and Gough Whitlam)
 Quentin Bryce (Kevin Rudd, Julia Gillard, and Tony Abbott)
 Peter Cosgrove (Tony Abbott, Malcolm Turnbull, and Scott Morrison)

Age

Age of appointment
The youngest prime minister upon their appointment by the Governor-General was Chris Watson, who was 37 years, and 18 days old when his term began on 27 April 1904.
The oldest prime minister upon their appointment was John McEwen, who was 67 years, and 265 days old when he took office in a temporary capacity on 17 December 1967.

Age on leaving office
The youngest prime minister to leave office was also Watson, who left office only four months after he was appointed at the age of 37 years, and 131 days.
The oldest prime minister to leave office was Menzies, who was 71 years and 37 days old when he stepped down on 26 January 1966.

Age differences between incoming and outgoing prime ministers
The largest age gap between an incoming prime minister and outgoing one was 22 years and 44 days between Chris Watson and George Reid during 1904. In recent years, the largest age gap between an incoming prime minister and outgoing one was 18 years and 57 days between John Howard and Kevin Rudd during 2007. The smallest age gap between an incoming prime minister and outgoing one was 27 days between Andrew Fisher and Billy Hughes during 1915. In recent years, the smallest age gap between an incoming prime minister and outgoing one was 44 days between Kevin Rudd and Tony Abbott during 2013.

Longest lived
The longest-lived prime minister was Gough Whitlam, who lived for 98 years and 102 days (1916–2014)

Shortest lived
The shortest-lived prime minister was Harold Holt, born 1908, who died in office at age 59 years and 134 days in 1967.

Longest retirement
The longest period of retirement (retirement being the period between the end of their last term and their death) for a prime minister was Whitlam's, which was 38 years, 344 days long (1975-2014).

Shortest retirement
The shortest period of retirement was Ben Chifley, who died in 1951, 1 year and 176 days after he left office.

Intervals between terms of office
Of the prime ministers who have served more than one term, the largest interval was that of Menzies, which lasted 10 years from 1939 to 1949.

Birthplace

Of the 31 prime ministers, 24 have been born in Australia. Of the ones that were not born in Australia, six were born in the United Kingdom:
 Reid and Fisher were born in Scotland
 Cook, Hughes and Abbott were born in England
 Gillard was born in Wales
 Watson was born in Chile.
Of the 24 prime ministers born within Australia:
 Nine have been born in modern-day Victoria in total. Six were born in colonial Victoria (Deakin, Bruce, Scullin, Menzies, Curtin and McEwen). Three have been born in Victoria in federated Australia (Gorton, Whitlam, and Fraser).
 Ten have been born in modern-day New South Wales. Three were born in colonial New South Wales (Barton, Page, and Chifley) and six were born in modern New South Wales (Holt, McMahon, Keating, Howard, Turnbull, Morrison, and Albanese).
 Three have been born in modern-day Queensland. Two of those were born in colonial Queensland (Fadden and Forde) and one in Queensland as its own state (Rudd).
 One (Hawke) was born in post-federation South Australia.
 One (Lyons) was born in colonial Tasmania
Some prime ministers represented electorates in states other than they were born in.

Months and zodiacs

Births by century
19th century: 1st, George Reid; last, Robert Menzies
20th century: 1st, John McEwen; most recent, Scott Morrison
Deaths by century
20th century: 1st, George Reid; last, William McMahon
21st century: 1st, John Gorton; most recent, Bob Hawke.
Between the births of George Reid in 1845 and Scott Morrison in 1968, a prime minister has been born in every decade.
Between the deaths of George Reid in 1918 and Bob Hawke in 2019, a prime minister has died in every decade except for the 1990s.
The decade with the most births – four – each in the 1860s and 1880s.
The decade with the most deaths – three – each in the 1940s, 1950s, 1960s, 1980s, and 2010s.
The month with the most births – seven – in September.
One prime minister each has been born in October and November.
No prime minister as of yet, has been born in June.
The months with the most deaths – four – in October.
One prime minister each has died in June, August, and September.
No prime minister as of yet, has died in February.

Federal elections

Most prime ministers in office between federal elections
There have been three periods between elections in which three prime ministers were in office. 
 Between the 1903 election and 1906 election, Deakin, Watson and Reid all took the office before Deakin regained it for the 1906 election after several parliamentary confidence shuffles between parties.
 Between the 1940 election and 1943 election, Menzies, Fadden and Curtin held the office after the House of Representatives lost confidence in the United Australia Party coalition.
 Between the 1943 election and 1946 election, Curtin held the office until his death, when Forde temporarily took the office and Chifley was elected as the leader of the Labor Party.
 Between the 1966 election and 1969 election, Holt held the office before McEwen took it over after his death and Gorton ultimately succeeded him.

Most elections contested
The largest number of elections contested by a prime minister is nine. Menzies contested the 1940, 1946, 1949, 1951, 1954, 1955, 1958, 1961, and 1963 elections. The greatest number of elections won by a prime minister is eight, a record also held by Menzies, who won 8 of the 9 elections he contested. The greatest number of elections lost by an individual is three, George Reid, H. V. Evatt, Arthur Calwell, and Gough Whitlam all lost three federal elections.

Age at losing an election
The oldest prime minister to lose a federal election was John Howard, who lost his own seat and the election of 2007 at 68 years and 121 days old. The oldest person to lose a federal election was Arthur Calwell, who lost the election of 1966 at 70 years and 90 days old. The youngest prime minister to lose a federal election was Stanley Bruce, who was 46 years, and 180 days old when he lost the 1929 election. In recent years, the youngest prime minister to lose a federal election was Paul Keating, who was 52 years and 44 days old when he lost the 1996 election. The youngest person to lose a federal election was Chris Watson who was 36 years and 251 days old when he lost the 1903 election. The youngest person to lose a federal election without ever becoming Prime Minister was Mark Latham who was 43 years and 223 days old when he lost the 2004 election.

Age at winning an election
The oldest prime minister to lead a party to victory at a federal election was Robert Menzies, who won the 1963 election aged 68 years and 347 days. The oldest prime minister to lead a party to victory at a federal election for the first time was Malcolm Turnbull, who won the 2016 election aged 61 years and 251 days. The youngest prime minister to win an election was Stanley Bruce, who was 42 years, and 213 days old when he won the 1925 election. In recent years, the youngest prime minister to win an election was Julia Gillard, who was 48 years, and 326 days old when she won the 2010 election.

Prime ministers in office without an election
Nearly all (24) prime ministers of Australia have held the office at some point during their tenures without the mandates from an election. This is a common occurrence due to the parliamentary and party systems in Australia, when the position is often made vacant by a spill or leader who is resigning or retiring. In the early days of the office, the unstable non-majority party system also caused many changes in power.
Prime ministers who have taken office due to inter-party confidence prior to the development of the stable two-party system:
 Chris Watson
 George Reid
 Alfred Deakin (second and third tenures)
 Andrew Fisher (first tenure)

Prime ministers who took office after their predecessors resigned:
 Alfred Deakin (first tenure)
 Stanley Bruce
 Robert Menzies (first tenure)
 Arthur Fadden
 Ben Chifley
 John Gorton

Prime ministers who took office after their predecessors retired:
 Billy Hughes
 Harold Holt

Prime ministers who took office after their predecessors died:
 Earle Page
 Frank Forde
 John McEwen

Prime ministers who took office after defeating the government in a vote of no confidence:
 John Curtin

Prime ministers who took office after defeating their predecessors in a party spill:
 William McMahon
 Paul Keating
 Julia Gillard
 Kevin Rudd
 Malcolm Turnbull
 Scott Morrison

Prime minister who took office after the incumbent government was dismissed by the Governor-General:
 Malcolm Fraser

Service to Parliament

Service in the Senate
Only John Gorton has come from the Senate. He served as a senator for Victoria for 17 years before he contested and won Harold Holt’s seat of Higgins in the House of Representatives.

Service in the House of Representatives
The shortest interval between entering Parliament and being appointed Prime Minister was achieved by Bob Hawke, who entered Parliament in October 1980 and was appointed Prime Minister only 29 months later in March 1983. The longest period of service prior to becoming Prime Minister was that of John McEwen, who had served 33 years in the House of Representatives before he became Prime Minister in December 1967. For a non-interim prime minister, the longest period of prior service was 30 years by Harold Holt, who was elected in a by-election in August 1935 and became Prime Minister in January 1966.
The longest service as an MP of a prime minister was Billy Hughes, who served from March 1901 until his death in October 1952, a total of 51 years. This is to date the longest period of service in the Australian Parliament and Hughes was father of the House from 1938 until 1952. The prime minister with the longest service in a single seat is 42 years by Earle Page, who served the seat of Cowper from December 1919 until December 1961. In recent years, the prime minister with the longest service in a single seat is 33 years by John Howard, who served the seat of Bennelong from May 1974 until December 2007.

Prime ministers who were Fathers of the House
Only one prime minister has held both that office and been Father of the House: John McEwen, from December 1967 until January 1968. Five prime ministers have served a long enough period in the House of Representatives to become Father of the House:
Italics indicate that a former or incumbent prime minister was a joint Father of the House.

Ancestry
The vast majority of them have been Anglo-Celtic Australians, tracing their ancestry to England, Ireland, and/or Scotland. Additionally, Alfred Deakin and Billy Hughes had some Welsh ancestry. Julia Gillard was born in Wales to Welsh parents, and is of almost exclusively Welsh descent.

Only four prime ministers are known to have been at least partly of non-Anglo-Celtic descent: Chris Watson, whose father was a German Chilean; Harold Holt, whose maternal grandmother was German; Malcolm Fraser, whose maternal grandfather was a Jewish New Zealander; and Anthony Albanese, whose father was Italian.

Religion
Most Australian Prime Ministers have been Christian.

Agnostic/atheist
 Bob Hawke, PM (1983-1991), Born to a Congregationalist minister He subsequently abandoned his Christian beliefs. By the time he entered politics he was a self-described agnostic.
 Julia Gillard, PM (2010-2013), as brought up in the Baptist tradition, but is an atheist. In a 2010 interview, when asked if she believed in God, she stated: "No, I don't ... I'm not a religious person ... I'm a great respecter of religious beliefs but they're not my beliefs."
 Malcolm Turnbull PM was agnostic for a lengthy period before becoming Prime Minister.

Anglican
 Billy Hughes PM (1915-1923) was a lifelong Anglican. He inherited this affiliation from his maternal side – his father was a Primitive Baptist and a deacon at the Welsh Baptist Church in London, though he wed with Anglican rites.
 Stanley Bruce PM (1923-1929) was sent to Melbourne Church of England Grammar School (now Melbourne Grammar School) and subsequently Stanley Bruce would come to identify principally as Anglican. 
 William McMahon PM (1971-1972) was an Anglican. He did not have a strong religious upbringing – his father was a lapsed Catholic and self-described "rationalist", while his mother's family were Anglican. 
 John Howard PM (1996-2007) was raised a Methodist but identified with Anglicanism later on in life. 
 Kevin Rudd, PM (2007-2010, 2013), Although raised a Roman Catholic, Rudd was actively involved in the Evangelical Union while studying at the Australian National University, and he began attending Anglican services in the 1980s with his wife.

Roman Catholic
 James Scullin, Australia elected its first Catholic prime minister (1929-1932) .
 Joseph Lyons PM (1932-1939)
 Ben Chifley, PM (1945-1949)  
 Tony Abbott, PM (2013-2015)
 Malcolm Turnbull PM (2015-2018), Raised Presbyterian, Turnbull became agnostic in the beginning of his adult life and later converted to Roman Catholicism "by mid-2002"; his wife's family is Roman Catholic.
 Anthony Albanese PM (2022-) Born and raised as a Catholic and said in an interview with 60 Minutes Albanese said his faith is very important to him.

Presbyterian
 Robert Menzies PM (1949-1966), the son of a Presbyterian-turned-Methodist lay preacher and imbibed his father's Protestant faith and values. During his studies at the University of Melbourne, Menzies served as president of the Students' Christian Union. Proud of his Scottish Presbyterian heritage with a living faith steeped in the Bible.
 Malcolm Turnbull PM (2015-2018) was raised Presbyterian.

Pentecostal
 Scott Morrison PM (2018-2022), raised in the Presbyterian Church of Australia, which partly merged into the Uniting Church when he was a child. He later became a Pentecostal and now attends the Horizon Church which is affiliated with the Australian Christian Churches, the Australian branch of the Assemblies of God. Morrison is Australia's first Pentecostal prime minister.

Military service
Eight of the thirty one prime ministers of Australia have served in the military. As of 2020, the last prime minister who had any military service was Gough Whitlam, who served as a pilot in the Air Force from 1941 to 1945, during World War II.
Only Harold Holt has served in the military during his parliamentary career. He served in the Armed Forces from 1939 to 1940, when he was asked to return by Menzies due to low parliamentary numbers and difficulties.

Living prime ministers

Currently living former prime ministers

Died in office
Three prime ministers have died in office:
 Joseph Lyons, who died on 7 April 1939, aged 59
 John Curtin, who died on 5 July 1945, aged 60
 Harold Holt, who disappeared on 17 December 1967 and was declared dead on 19 December, aged 59

Died while immediate successor was in office
Earle Page and Ben Chifley's successor, Robert Menzies, was in office when Chifley and Page died in 1951 and 1961 respectively.

Miscellaneous records
The prime minister who had the most children is Joseph Lyons, who fathered 12 children.

The tallest prime minister is believed to be Gough Whitlam, who stood at around 6 feet 4 inches (194 cm) in height.

The longest personal name held by an Australian prime minister was that of Earle Page whose four names – Earle Christmas Grafton Page – total 25 letters. The shortest baptismal names, each 10 letters long, were held by John Curtin and John McEwen.

By-elections
 The fastest prime minister to win a by-election was John Gorton, who won the 1968 Higgins by-election which he contested after only one month in office.
 The fastest prime minister to lose a by-election was Alfred Deakin, who lost the 1904 Melbourne by-election after only six months in office.

References

Australian records
Prime Minister of Australia